Ruling Passions is a lost 1918 American silent drama film produced, written, and directed by Abraham S. Schomer and starring Julia Dean. It was released on State Rights basis.

Cast
Julia Dean as Eveline Roland
Edwin Arden as John Walton
Claire Whitney as Louise Palmer
Earl Schenck as Alexander Vernon
Doan Borrup as Lew

References

External links

1918 films
American silent feature films
Lost American films
American black-and-white films
Silent American drama films
1918 drama films
1910s American films
1910s English-language films
English-language drama films